Sarah Nilsson (born 24 July 1997) is a Swedish professional golfer. She won the Swedish Golf Tour Order of Merit in 2017 was a Ladies European Tour (LET) rookie in 2018.

Personal life
Nilsson's sister Emma (three years older) is also a professional golfer on the Ladies European Tour. Both sisters played in the inaugural Saint-Malo Golf Mixed Open in 2019, the first professional event to see female and male golfers from two tours play for the same trophy, with their parents caddying for them.

Career
Nilsson won the 2015 Tourfinal Vellinge Open on the Swedish Golf Tour while still an amateur. She turned professional and joined the 2016 LET Access Series as a teenager, and had four top-10 finishes in her rookie season. The following year, she won the Ladies Norwegian Open and the Swedish Golf Tour Order of Merit. In 2018, she made five LET starts, with a best finish of T15 at the dual-ranked Jabra Ladies Open.

Nilsson finished sixth at the Q-School for the 2019 Ladies European Tour behind Bronte Law, Linnea Ström, Esther Henseleit, Sian Evans and Leona Maguire, after losing a playoff to Maguire for the fifth and final full card. She started 14 LET tournaments in 2019 and finished 85th on the Order of Merit.

Amateur wins
2011 Skandia Tour Skåne
2012 Skandia Cup Riksfinal 
2014 Skandia Tour Elit

Professional wins (4)

Swedish Golf Tour wins (3)

Other wins (1)
2016 Sölvesborg Open

References

External links

Swedish female golfers
Ladies European Tour golfers
Sportspeople from Skåne County
People from Kristianstad Municipality
1997 births
Living people
21st-century Swedish women